The Finger Lakes Heartbreakers were a W-League club based in Syracuse, New York. The team folded after the 1998 season.

Year-by-year

Soccer in Syracuse, New York
Defunct USL W-League (1995–2015) teams
Women's soccer clubs in New York (state)
1998 establishments in New York (state)
1998 disestablishments in New York (state)
Association football clubs established in 1998
Association football clubs disestablished in 1998